Heteren is a village in the Dutch province of Gelderland. It is located in the municipality of Overbetuwe, about 12 km (7.4 mi) southwest of Arnhem on the south bank of the Rhine.

Heteren was a separate municipality until 2001, when it became a part of the new municipality of Overbetuwe. Heteren is home to the main distribution centre of leading Dutch pharmacy chain Kruidvat.

Gallery

References

Municipalities of the Netherlands disestablished in 2001
Populated places in Gelderland
Former municipalities of Gelderland
Overbetuwe